Weather Is Good on Deribasovskaya, It Rains Again on Brighton Beach is a 1992 joint Russian–American production comedy film directed by Leonid Gaidai and his last film. Its title used in the plot as a password for secret agents and refers to Derybasivska Street and Brighton Beach.

Plot
The action takes place in the last years of the existence of the USSR. The Cold War is over, the presidents of the two great powers the USSR and the United States must meet for important negotiations. However, the meeting was in jeopardy due to the rampant Russian mafia, which settled in the United States (mafioso Rabinovich suddenly intervenes in the conversation of the presidents on a top-secret telephone line and disconnects them in order to urgently call Odessa).

In the Russian bath, the working groups of the KGB and the CIA meet and celebrate the beginning of cooperation. In the meantime, CIA officers tell their KGB colleagues about the rampant Russian mafia in the United States. They know the leader of the mafia, who transforms into Hitler, Napoleon, Peter the Great, Saddam Hussein, Othello and other characters, but no one has seen his real face. The KGB general is surprised and calls him an artist, to which the CIA general replies that this is his real nickname "Artist".

To help his American colleagues eliminate the Russian mafia, the KGB general decides to send a super agent Fyodor Sokolov from Odessa to New York. Having received an order to urgently fly to Moscow, Sokolov was forced to fly from Odessa and land on Red Square on a Yak-55 sports plane, since the air traffic controllers had a strike that day (an allusion to the scandalous flight of Matthias Rust).

Arriving in the United States, Sokolov finds the "Langeron" restaurant, a famous gathering place for the Russian mafia in New York, where he accidentally meets a certain Uncle Misha, who tells the KGB agent about the restaurant's visitors and introduces them as members of the Russian mafia, although they really are not. At the end of the evening, the local singer, Mary Star, performs in the restaurant and charms Sokolov.

The next day, the KGB agent has an appointment with the CIA agent. He goes to the radio operator, Monya, but the password has not been sent from Moscow yet. Sokolov goes to a cafe, where Mary Star joins him. In order not to fail the assignment, Sokolov, remembering the words of his teacher colonel Petrenko that "the scout must ignore a beautiful woman", is trying to do so. From the radio operator, Sokolov learns that the meeting with the CIA agent should take place in the same cafe and at the same third table at which he and the singer were sitting. There, in the instructions, it was said that the agent must give the password: "The weather is good on Deribasovskaya", to which Sokolov should have answered: "It rains again on Brighton Beach". The CIA agent turns out to be the same singer from the restaurant. She is responsible for ensuring the safety of Sokolov, he leads her to his room, in which she tells him about all the secret devices installed there.

Sokolov travels to Brighton Beach and accidentally meets Uncle Misha, who provides a note addressed to him. Mafiosi offer Fyodor to meet at the Golden Duke casino, which belongs to the Russian mafia. Its director, one of "Artist's" people, offers the agent to return to the USSR for money. Sokolov is again helped by the methods of colonel Petrenko he devastates the casino, as a result of which the mafiosi are forced to shoot themselves. Sokolov goes to a restaurant with Uncle Misha, who was shot with a sucker with a note: "Artist will be waiting at 18:00 on the pier." But another plan of the mafia to get rid of him fails: this time Sokolov is saved by Mary Star. Artist, in the image of Nikita Sergeevich Khrushchev, scolds Kravchuk at the lair for another failure.

The next day, the sheikh comes to the city. The Russian mafia plans to kidnap him and demand a ransom of a billion dollars. Mary kidnaps the sheikh and disguises him as Sokolov, and Sokolov as sheikh. After Sokolov, disguised as a sheikh, goes to bed, the mafioso Kravchuk breaks the glass ceiling in the bedroom, lifts the bed with the sheikh-Sokolov in a helicopter and takes him to the mafia's lair, which, trying to find out from him the whereabouts of the sheikh, begins to torture him. They try to drown the KGB agent in vain, but he drinks all the water and then regurgitates it back, dousing Kravchuk; tortured with a hot iron, but the iron does not leave burns, and Kravchuk gets burned. In the end, he is thrown into the basement, then Uncle Misha is brought there, who had shouted to the whole restaurant the day before that Fyodor Sokolov was his best friend. He begs the agent to inform the mafia where the sheikh is, scaring him that the mafia has already captured and tortured Mary. At this time, a woman's scream is heard behind the wall, and Sokolov, thinking that it is Mary, begins to knock on the locked door. Then came Kravchuk, and Fyodor said to him that he was ready to give the sheikh to Artist. He understands this literally and, to Sokolov's surprise, addresses this to Uncle Misha, thereby revealing him. Then Sokolov is shackled and walled up in the wall. Suddenly, Mary drives into the building on a motorcycle and saves Sokolov. Mafiosi set off in pursuit, using a tank and toxic substances, but despite this, Mary and Sokolov escape, and the generals who followed them catch the criminals. The Russian mafia in the USA has been defeated.

The presidents of the USSR and the USA again agree on the phone about the planned meeting in Hawaii, but Rabinovich "from the Russian mafia" again interferes in their conversation and again disconnects them.

Cast
 Dmitry Kharatyan as Fyodor Sokolov, KGB agent / sheik
 Kelly McGrill as Mary Star, CIA agent
 Andrey Myagkov as Artist, head of the Russian Mafia
 Mikhail Kokshenov as Kravchuk, mafioso
 Yuri Volyntsev as Styopa, KGB general
 Emmanuil Vitorgan as Jack, CIA general
 Armen Dzhigarkhanyan as Katz, mafioso
 Mamuka Kikaleishvili as Tsuladze, mafioso
 Yevgeni Vesnik as Monya
 Natalya Krachkovskaya as Monya's Wife
 Aleksandr Loye as Monya's Grandson
 Leonid Kuravlyov as Mikhail Gorbachev
 Vladimir Sedov as George H. W. Bush
 Spartak Mishulin as Eunuch
 Kelly McGillis as Marriott Manager
 Nikolai Parfyonov as colonel Petrenko
 Serafim Strelkov as captain Kamikazev

Facts
The film's casino scenes were filmed at the Trump Taj Mahal Casino Resort (now the Hard Rock Hotel & Casino Atlantic City).

References

External links

1992 comedy films
1992 films
1990s crime comedy films
1992 multilingual films
American crime comedy films
American multilingual films
Cultural depictions of Mikhail Gorbachev
Films about the Russian Mafia
Films directed by Leonid Gaidai
Films scored by Aleksandr Zatsepin
Films shot in New York City
Russian multilingual films
Russian-American culture in New York City
1990s American films
Films shot in Atlantic City, New Jersey
Foreign films set in the United States